Laura Hingston (born 11 August 1995) is an Australian diver. She competed in the women's 10 metre platform event at the 2019 World Aquatics Championships.

References

1995 births
Living people
Australian female divers
Place of birth missing (living people)
20th-century Australian women
21st-century Australian women